Aleksandr Nikolayevich Belozyorov (born 27 October 1981) is a former Russian footballer who played as a centre-back.

External links 
 
 Profile at Krylya Sovetov site 

1981 births
Sportspeople from Tolyatti
Living people
Russian footballers
Russia under-21 international footballers
Association football defenders
FC Lada-Tolyatti players
FC Spartak Moscow players
FC Chernomorets Novorossiysk players
FC KAMAZ Naberezhnye Chelny players
PFC Krylia Sovetov Samara players
FC Volga Nizhny Novgorod players
Russian Premier League players
FC Mordovia Saransk players
FC Ural Yekaterinburg players
FC Akron Tolyatti players
FC Spartak-2 Moscow players